Year 1378 (MCCCLXXVIII) was a common year starting on Friday (link will display the full calendar) of the Julian calendar.

Events 
 January–December 
 January – Charles IV, Holy Roman Emperor, visits his nephew Charles V of France in Paris, to celebrate publicly the friendship between their two nations.
 January 13 – Balša II succeeds his brother, Durađ I, as ruler of Lower Zeta (modern-day Montenegro).
 March – In England, John Wycliffe tries to promote his ideas for Catholic reform by laying his theses before Parliament, and making them public in a tract. He is subsequently summoned before the Archbishop of Canterbury, Simon of Sudbury, at the episcopal palace at Lambeth, to defend his actions.
 April 9 – Following the death of Pope Gregory XI, and riots in Rome calling for a Roman pope, the cardinals, who are mostly French, elect Pope Urban VI (Bartolomeo Prignano, Archbishop of Bari) as the 202nd Pope.
 April 16 – Da'ud Shah succeeds his assassinated nephew, Aladdin Mujahid Shah, as ruler of the Bahmani Sultanate in modern-day southern India. Da'ud Shah is assassinated in the following month, and is succeeded by Mohammad Shah II.
 May – Uskhal Khan Tögüs Temür succeeds his father, Biligtü Khan Ayushiridara, as ruler of the Northern Yuan dynasty in Mongolia.
 July 21 – Ciompi Revolt: Discontented wool carders briefly take over the government of Florence. 
 August 4 – Gian Galeazzo Visconti succeeds his father, Galeazzo II Visconti, as ruler of Milan.
 August 11 – Battle of the Vozha River: Prince Dmitri Ivanovich of Moscow resists a small invasion by the Mongol Blue Horde under Mamai.
 September – A contract is set up between Richard le Scrope, 1st Baron Scrope of Bolton and the mason Johan Lewyn, for the construction of Bolton Castle in the north of England.
 September 20 – Unhappy with Pope Urban's critical attitude towards them, the majority of the cardinals meet at Fondi, elect Clement VII as antipope, and establish a rival papal court at Avignon. This split within the Catholic Church becomes known as the Western Schism. France, Aragon, Castile and León, Cyprus, Burgundy, Savoy, Naples and Scotland choose to recognise Antipope Clement VII. Denmark, England, Flanders, the Holy Roman Empire, Hungary, northern Italy, Ireland, Norway, Poland and Sweden continue to recognise Pope Urban VI.
 November 10 – Estimated appearance date of Halley's Comet.
 November 29 – Charles IV, Holy Roman Emperor, dies in Prague. He is succeeded by his son, Wenceslaus, as King of Bohemia, but the office of Holy Roman Emperor falls into abeyance, until Charles's son Sigismund is crowned in 1433.

 Date unknown 
 The Raseborg Castle is mentioned for the first time in documents, but its actual date of foundation is unknown.
 Tokhtamysh dethrones Temur-Malik to become Khan of the White Horde.
 Uthman Beg establishes the Aq Qoyunlu (Turkomans of the White Sheep) dynasty at Diyarbakır, in modern-day southeast Turkey.
 Ottoman Turks capture the town of Ihtiman in west Bulgaria.
 Tai Bian succeeds Zhao Bing Fa as King of Mong Mao (modern-day northern Myanmar).
 Sa'im al-Dahr is hanged for blowing the nose off the Great Sphinx of Giza.

Births 
 January 23 – Louis III, Elector Palatine (d. 1436)
 May 27 – Zhu Quan, Chinese military commander, historian and playwright (d. 1448)
 August 16 – Hongxi Emperor of China (d. 1425)
 October 24 – David Stewart, Duke of Rothesay, heir to throne of Scotland (d. 1402)
 December 31 – Pope Callixtus III (d. 1458)
 date unknown
 Vittorino da Feltre, Italian humanist (d. 1446)
 Joan II, Countess of Auvergne, French vassal (d. 1424)
 Lorenzo Ghiberti, Italian sculptor and metal-worker (d. 1455)
 John Hardyng, English chronicler (d. 1465)

Deaths 
 
 February 6 – Joanna of Bourbon, queen consort of Charles V of France (b. 1338)
 March 27 – Pope Gregory XI (b.  c. 1329)
 July – Owain Lawgoch, titular Prince of Wales and mercenary – assassinated (b. c. 1330)
 August 4 – Galeazzo II Visconti, Lord of Milan (b. c. 1320)
 November 29 – Charles IV, Holy Roman Emperor (b. 1316)
 November 30 – Andrew Stratford, English verderer and landowner

References